Benzazocine, also known as benzoazocine, is a chemical compound. It consists of a benzene ring bound to an azocine ring. A related compound is benzomorphan.

See also 
 Azocine
 Benzomorphan